Elsa N'Guessan (born 17 September 1984 in Poitiers, Vienne) is a female freestyle swimmer from France, who competed for her native country at the 2004 Summer Olympics in Athens, Greece.

References 

1984 births
Living people
French female freestyle swimmers
Swimmers at the 2004 Summer Olympics
Olympic swimmers of France
Sportspeople from Poitiers
French sportspeople of Ivorian descent
European Aquatics Championships medalists in swimming
Mediterranean Games gold medalists for France
Swimmers at the 2005 Mediterranean Games
Universiade medalists in swimming
Mediterranean Games medalists in swimming
Universiade bronze medalists for France
Medalists at the 2005 Summer Universiade